Danilo Radjen (born June 22, 1994) is an American soccer player who plays for 1. MFL side Borec.

Career

College and amateur
Radjen began playing college soccer at Cleveland State University in 2012, where he played for two seasons and making 36 appearances for the Vikings and was named Horizon League All-Newcomer Team in his freshman season. He transferred to the University of Akron in 2013. Radjen missed most of the 2014 season due to injury, but played for two further seasons and made 30 appearances for the Zips, as well as being named Academic All-Mid American Conference in 2015 and 2016.

Whilst at college, Radjen spent a season in the USL PDL with West Virginia Chaos.

Professional

MLS SuperDraft
On January 13, 2017, Radjen was selected 36th overall in the 2017 MLS SuperDraft by Houston Dynamo. However, he did not sign with the team.

New York Cosmos
In April 2017, Radjen was announced as being on the roster for side New York Cosmos who played in the via their first team who competed in the NASL.  He made 15 appearances for the Cosmos reserve team in 2017, but didn't appear for the first team.

FK Partizan
Following a year out of the game, Radjen signed with Serbian SuperLiga side FK Partizan and was soon loaned to newly promoted Serbian First League side FK Teleoptik for the season on July 15, 2020.

OFK Bačka
After a season with Teleoptik, Radjen signed a one-year deal with Serbian SuperLiga club OFK Bačka on July 31, 2020. He made his debut for the club on September 13, 2020, appearing as an injury-time substitute during a 2–1 loss to Mladost Lučani.

Borec
In August 2021, Radjen signed with 1. MFL side Borec.
A hand injury that needed to be operated on made him sit out the last two months of the season. Radjen was given team of the week honors multiple times during the season.

References

External links
 

1994 births
Living people
American soccer players
Association football defenders
Cleveland State Vikings men's soccer players
Akron Zips men's soccer players
West Virginia Chaos players
New York Cosmos (2010) players
New York Cosmos B players
FK Partizan players
FK Teleoptik players
OFK Bačka players
FK Borec players
Serbian First League players
Serbian SuperLiga players
Expatriate footballers in Serbia
Expatriate footballers in North Macedonia
Soccer players from Ohio
People from Broadview Heights, Ohio
National Premier Soccer League players
USL League Two players
Houston Dynamo FC draft picks